Dawid Sołdecki (born 29 April 1987 in Krasnystaw) is a Polish footballer who plays as a defender for IV liga side .

Early life
Sołdecki was born on 29 April 1987 in Krasnystaw and also grew up in Krasnystaw with his parents, he has a niece named Aleksandra (diminutive Ola) with whom he also grew up with during the elevation of his professional football career in 2004 when he was signed with Jedynka Krasnystaw aged just 17 years old.

Honours

Club
Arka Gdynia
 Polish Cup: 2016–17
 Polish Super Cup: 2017, 2018

External links
 
 

Polish footballers
1987 births
Living people
Association football defenders
Jagiellonia Białystok players
Górnik Łęczna players
Bruk-Bet Termalica Nieciecza players
Arka Gdynia players
Wigry Suwałki players
Ekstraklasa players
I liga players
III liga players
People from Krasnystaw
Sportspeople from Lublin Voivodeship